Xylosoma serrata is a species of flowering plant in the family Salicaceae. It is endemic to the island of Montserrat.

References

serrata